Boris Markov (March 7, 1924, village Khitekushkan' (now Tautovskoye Rural Settlement, Alikovsky District, Chuvash Republic) Chuvash AO, USSR - March 25, 1977, Moscow, USSR) was a Soviet, Chuvash actor and theater director, People's Artist of the RSFSR, People Artist of the Chuvash ASSR, the founder and first director of the Chuvash State Ballet&Opera Theatre.

Biography
Boris Markov born on March 7, 1924, in the village  of the Alikovsky District in the Chuvash AO (USSR).

Boris Markov was born and spent children's and youthful years in Khitekushkan'  village ((Tautovskoye Rural Settlement)) of the Alikovsky District of the Chuvash ASSR. Having graduated from Tavutovsky school arrives in Cheboksary pedagogical college. Having finished training Boris Semyonovich teaches children at native school.

From the Great Patriotic War beginning Boris Semenovich leaves to be at war on the front against Nazi armies, serves in artillery.

After completion of war Boris Markov arrived to study in GITIS. Study passed in the Chuvash studio under hands. M. M. Tarkhanov. 1947 he returned to Cheboksary as the certified specialist. Seven years played leading roles in performances on a scene of the Chuvash academic theater of a name K.V. Ivanov. For a contribution to art Boris Semyonovich is awarded ranks of the national actor of the Chuvash ASSR.

In 1959 B. Markov having finished training in GITIS receives the diploma of the musical director. Him invite to create the Chuvash musical theater, he becomes the main director of theater. Boris Semenovich opens vocal and ballet studios.

In May, 1960 on a scene of the Chuvash state musical drama theater the first Chuvash opera — "Шывармань" (Water-mill) of Feodor Vasilyev is born. After a while B. Markov puts (for the first time in Russia!) B. Mokrousov's opera of "Chapay". Being the main director of the Chuvash musical theater, B. S. Markov in 1968—1972 works as the opera director in the Bolshoi Theatre of the USSR, gives lectures in GITIS, deserves a rank of the assistant professor.

In 1966 Boris Semenovich invite to work in the Ministry of culture of RSFSR. It works as the head of department of opera theaters of Russia.

To a great regret, Boris Semenovich Markov's life suddenly broke at the peak of a creative power, heart of the master ceased to fight on March 25, 1977, in Moscow (USSR).

Legacy of the Master
B. Markov is the author of articles on musical theater and book "The Birth of the musical theater of the Chuvashia", "My House", more than 40 articles on the art.

Memory 
 Tautovo school bears his name (Alikovsky district, 2010).
 Boris Markov's street (Cheboksary)

Relatives 
 Anatoly Markov (statesman) — brother.

See also
 Nadezhda Pavlova - Soviet Chuvash ballet dancer.

References

Literature
 Борис Семенович Марков : [буклет] / ред.-сост. И. Евсеева. – Cheboksary : Б. и., 1994. – 1 л. : ил., портр.
 Канюкова, А. С., "Жизнь, отданная театру"/ А. С. Канюкова, А. С. Марков. – Cheboksary: Изд-во ЧГУ, 1999. – 134 с. : ил.
 Алексеев, О. "Оперăпа балет театрне – Борис Марков ятне" / О. Алексеев // Хыпар. – 2001. – 16 çу.
 Кондратьев, В. "Борис Марков пурнăçĕпе паллаштарать" / В. Кондратьев // Хыпар. – 2001. – 21 нарăс.
 Заломнов, П. Д. "Марков Борис Семенович" // Заломнов, П. Д. Чувашский государственный театр оперы и балета и ведущие мастера его сцены / П. Д. Заломнов. – Cheboksary, 2002. – С. 25–26.
 Марков, А. С. "На театральных подмостках трагедии разыгрываются по-настоящему" / А. С. Марков // СЧ–Столица. – 2000. – 26 янв. – 1 февр. (No. 3). – С. 15.
 Романов, П. В. "Марков Борис Семенович" / П. В. Романов // Краткая чувашская энциклопедия. – Cheboksary, 2001. – С. 263.
 Л. И. Ефимов, «Элӗк Енӗ» (Край Аликовский), Alikovo, 1994.
 "Аликовская энциклопедия", редколлегия: Ефимов Л.А., Ефимов Е.Л., Ананьев А. А., Терентьев Г. К., Cheboksary, 2009, .

External links
 В.Давыдов-Анатри о Борисе Маркове
 Гала-концертом завершился оперный фестиваль в Чувашии
 Гала-концерт в селе Аликово
  Знатные люди Чувашии: Борис Семенович Марков
 Юбиляры 2009 г. — Марков Борис Семенович

1924 births
1977 deaths
People from Alikovsky District
Russian opera directors
Soviet military personnel of World War II
20th-century Russian people
Chuvash people